When Soul Meets Soul is a 1913 silent film romantic fantasy short directed by Norman MacDonald and produced by the Essanay Studios out of Chicago. It starred Francis X. Bushman and Dolores Cassinelli. It was produced by the Essanay Studios and distributed by the General Film Company.

This film survives in the Library of Congress collection.

Cast
Francis X. Bushman - Prince Arames/Professor Delaplane
Dolores Cassinelli - Princess Charazel
Fred Wulf - Professor's Assistant
Beverly Bayne - 1st Egyptian Lady
Ruth Stonehouse - 2nd Egyptian Lady
Mildred Watson - 3rd Egyptian Lady
Eva Prout - Serving Girl

unbilled
Helen Dunbar - 
Bryant Washburn

See also
Francis X. Bushman filmography

References

External links
 When Soul Meets Soul at IMDb.com

1913 films
Essanay Studios films
American silent short films
1913 short films
American black-and-white films
American fantasy films
1910s fantasy films
1910s American films
1910s English-language films